The CCHA Tournament is the conference tournament for the Central Collegiate Hockey Association (CCHA), an NCAA Division I men's ice hockey conference that originally operated from 1971 to 2013 and has been revived effective in 2021. The winner of the tournament receives an automatic berth into the NCAA Tournament.  The winner of the tournament also receives the Mason Cup, which was first presented in 2001. In other years, the trophy was known as the CCHA Tournament Championship Trophy.

The tournament was first held in 1972, the first year of conference play. It was held at The Arena in St. Louis, Missouri from 1972–77. From 1978–81, the CCHA Tournament was held at the rink of the higher seed. Starting in 1982, the CCHA Tournament first round was held at the rink of the higher seed with Joe Louis Arena in Detroit, Michigan hosting the CCHA Tournament semifinals and finals. From 1993–94 and 2002–05, the CCHA championship format had six teams competing at Joe Louis Arena with the bottom four teams competing for the third and fourth spots in the semifinals.

In February 2020, seven schools that had announced several months earlier that they would leave the Western Collegiate Hockey Association after the 2020–21 season announced that they would form a new CCHA, with the 2021–22 season as the first for the revived league. The tournament resumed in 2022 with the Mason Cup once again being awarded to the tournament champion.

CCHA Men's Ice Hockey Tournament champions

Formats
 1972
The CCHA Tournament format begins as a single-game elimination two-round format.

 1973
A round-robin championship format was adopted. Although not a member of the CCHA's Division I, Western Michigan is invited as the fourth team in the CCHA Tournament.

 1974–75
The single-game elimination format returns. Western Michigan is invited for a second year as the fourth team in the CCHA Tournament.

 1976
Championship game is changed to a two-game, total-goals series.

 1977–81
All tournament rounds are changed to a two-game, total-goals series.

 1982–85
First round series remain a two-game, total-goals series. Semifinals and finals are changed to single-game elimination format. The CCHA Tournament is expanded from four teams to eight teams in a three-round format.

 1986
First round series changed to a best two-of-three format. Semifinals and finals remain single-game elimination.

 1993–94
With the addition of Kent State and Notre Dame to the league and Alaska as an affiliate member, the tournament expanded to 12 teams. A quarterfinal at Joe Louis Arena narrows the field from six to four. Alaska is placed in the tournament by team choice. In order, the top six teams select their opponent for the first round among the bottom five teams and Alaska. The CCHA eliminates the consolation game.

 1995
The tournament retracts to 10 teams. A highest seed-hosts, midweek play-in game narrows the field from five to four.

 1996–99
Tournament format returns to eight teams.

 2000–01
The tournament field expands back to 10 along with the midweek play-in game.

 2002–05
All 12 teams qualify for the tournament with a quarterfinal at Joe Louis Arena narrowing the field from six to four. The consolation game returns to boost records and rankings for NCAA Tournament selection.

 2006–13
All 11 league members qualified for the tournament. A four-round format was introduced beginning in 2006 with the top five seeds receiving byes and the remaining six teams playing in an on-campus best two-of-three first round series. After the first round, the field was reseeded for the quarterfinal round for an on-campus best two-of-three series. The remaining four teams were reseeded for the CCHA Championship at Joe Louis Arena in Detroit.

 2022–present
The revived CCHA tournament involves all eight members, seeded according to regular-season conference records. The top four teams host best-of-three series in the opening round, matched in the standard format of 1–8, 2–7, 3–6, and 4–5. The semifinals consist of single games hosted by the top two surviving seeds. The final is also a single game, hosted by the top remaining seed.

Championship appearances

By school

By coach

"Modern Era"
In 1981–82, four teams from the WCHA (Michigan, Michigan State, Michigan Tech and Notre Dame) defected to the CCHA. The four teams brought their long, storied history with 12 combined NCAA National Championships giving the young, up-start league instant credibility. The tournament championship was moved from small on-campus rinks to Joe Louis Arena, home of the NHL's Detroit Red Wings. These events give the league a distinct turning point at which the "Modern Era" of the CCHA Tournament begins.

"Road to the Joe"
Commissioner Bill Beagan coined the phrase "Road to the Joe" in describing the CCHA Tournament in 1985–86. The phrase is commonly used in reference to the CCHA Tournament.

"Super Six"
With the tournament expanding to 12 teams in 2001–02, the CCHA adopted the name "Super Six" in reference to the six teams who advance past the first round to the CCHA championships at Joe Louis Arena. The name was dropped following the 2005 season when the CCHA championships were reduced back to four teams.

References

External links
Central Collegiate Hockey Association's Official Athletic Site